Jerome O'Neill (born September 24, 1946) is an attorney from Vermont. He is most notable for his service as an Assistant U.S. Attorney for Vermont (1973–1975), First Assistant U.S. Attorney (1975–1981), and United States Attorney (1981).

Early life
Jerome F. O'Neill was born in Burlington, Vermont, on September 24, 1946, a son of Phyllis (Chagnon) O'Neill and Frederick A. O'Neill, a United States Army officer and inspector for the Immigration and Naturalization Service. O'Neill's relatives included his uncle Edward J. O'Neill, a lieutenant general in the U.S. Army. O'Neill was raised in Swanton and attended St. Anne's Academy, from which he graduated in 1964.

O'Neill began attendance at Georgetown University in the fall of 1964, and he received his Bachelor of Science in foreign trade in 1968. While in college, O'Neill took part in the Reserve Officers' Training Corps program and served as secretary of the Scabbard and Blade Society.

After college, O'Neill began attendance at Georgetown University Law Center, from which he received his Juris Doctor in 1971. He was admitted to the bar in the District of Columbia in 1971. O'Neill served in the U.S. Army from 1971 to 1972 and attained the rank of first lieutenant.

Career
After his military service, O'Neill was a law clerk in 1972 for Judge Sylvia Bacon of the Superior Court of the District of Columbia. From 1972 to 1973, he was a law clerk for Judge Albert Wheeler Coffrin of the U.S. District Court for Vermont.

In 1973, O'Neill was appointed an Assistant U.S. Attorney for the Vermont District Court and was based in Rutland. In 1975, he was promoted to First Assistant U.S. Attorney, and in 1976 he relocated to Burlington to establish the U.S. Attorney's office there. He served as first assistant until May 1981, when he was appointed to succeed William B. Gray as United States Attorney for the District of Vermont. He served until October, and was succeeded by George W. F. Cook.

After leaving the U.S. Attorney's office, O'Neill resided in Burlington and practiced law as the senior partner of the Burlington firm that included Geoffrey W. Crawford and eventually became O’Neill, Kellner & Green. He subsequently became of counsel at Burlington's Gravel & Shea.

References

1946 births
Living people
People from Swanton (town), Vermont
People from Burlington, Vermont
Georgetown College (Georgetown University) alumni
Georgetown University Law Center alumni
United States Army officers
Vermont lawyers
Assistant United States Attorneys
United States Attorneys for the District of Vermont
20th-century American lawyers